The Filobasidiales are an order in the fungal class Tremellomycetes. The order contains two families and seven genera.

References

Tremellomycetes
Basidiomycota orders